Shaun Wade (also Sean) may refer to:

Sean Wade (born 1966), New Zealand long-distance runner
Shaun Wade (footballer) (born 1969), English footballer
Shaun Wade (American football) (born 1998), American football player